The Aceh Tsunami Museum, located in Banda Aceh, Aceh, Indonesia, is a museum designed as a symbolic reminder of the 2004 Indian Ocean earthquake and tsunami disaster, as well as an educational center and an emergency disaster shelter in case the area is ever hit by a tsunami again.

Design 
The Aceh Tsunami Museum was designed by Indonesian architect (and now incumbent Governor of West Java) Ridwan Kamil. The museum is a 2,500 m2 four-story structure; its long curving walls covered in geometric reliefs. Inside, visitors enter through a dark, narrow corridor between two high walls of water — meant to recreate the noise and panic of the tsunami itself. The museum walls are adorned with images of people performing the Saman dance, a symbolic gesture dedicated to the strength, discipline and religious beliefs of the Acehnese people. From above, the roof resembles a tsunami. The ground floor is modelled on the kind of traditional raised Acehnese houses that were best equipped to survive the tsunami.

The building acknowledges both the victims, whose names are to be inscribed on the wall of one of the museum's internal chambers, and the surviving members of the local community.

In addition to its role as a memorial for those who died, the museum also offers a place of refuge from future such events, including an "escape hill" for visitors to run to in the event of another tsunami.

Collection 
Exhibitions at the museum include an electronic simulation of the 2004 Indian Ocean earthquake and tsunami, in addition to photographs of victims and exhibits featuring stories from survivors of the disaster.

Maintenance and use 

Adequate funding for the ongoing maintenance and use of the Aceh Tsunami Museum has not been forthcoming. The museum is one of a large number of so-called "tsunami assets", the precise legal ownership of which has been in dispute between different levels of Indonesian governments since at least 2009.  As of late 2010, the Museum was only open intermittently and was poorly patronised.

References 

2004 Indian Ocean earthquake and tsunami
Museums in Aceh
Museums established in 2009
Buildings and structures in Banda Aceh
History museums in Indonesia
Natural disaster museums